Yishai is a Hebrew given name and surname. It is the origin of the English given name Jesse, and is the original Hebrew name of  Jesse father of David. Variant spellings include Yishay, Ishay, Yshai, and Yeshay. There is also a derived patronymic surname Ben-Yishai.

Given name
Isai Scheinberg (born ), Israeli online gambling entrepreneur
Ishay Hadas (born 1955), Israeli television producer
Yishai Beer (born 1956), Israeli Defense Forces general
Yishay Yafeh (born 1962), Israeli economist
Yishai Levi (born 1963), Israeli musician
Yishai Sarid (born 1965), Israel writer and lawyer
Yishay Garbasz (born 1970), Israeli artist
Yishai Fleisher (born 1970s), Israeli settler in Hebron
Ishai Golan (born 1973), Israel actor
Yishai Schlissel (born 1975), Israeli man convicted for murder
Ishay Berger (born 1978), Israeli musician
Yishai Romanoff (born 1986), American musician
Ishay Ribo (born 1989), Israeli singer-songwriter
Yshai Oliel (born 2000), Israeli tennis player
Ishai Setton, American film director

Surname
Ron Ben-Yishai (born 1943), Israeli journalist
Galia Yishai (1950–2020), Israeli actress and singer
Orit Ishay (born 1961), Israeli artist
Eli Yishai (born 1962), Israeli politician
Yishai Sarid (born 1965), Israeli novelist
Ran Ichay (born 1970), Israeli diplomat
Jeffrey Yishai (born 1975), Israeli footballer
Melissa Ben-Ishay (born 1984), American cupcake company executive
Shefi Yishai, Israeli composer
Micheline Ishay, American political theorist
Talia Ishai (born 1994), Israeli musician
Stephanie Ben-Ishai, Canadian law professor

References

Hebrew masculine given names
Hebrew-language surnames